Live It Up! is a British musical film (US release title: Sing and Swing) that starred David Hemmings and was released in 1963. It was filmed at Pinewood Studios and featured musical acts from numerous contributors, including Gene Vincent, Jenny Moss, the Outlaws, Patsy Ann Noble, the Saints and Heinz Burt (most of them being produced by Joe Meek, who wrote the film's theme) among others, most notably Kenny Ball and His Jazzmen. The film also featured young actor Steve Marriott (later a well-known singer and guitarist with Small Faces and Humble Pie). Another actor, Mitch Mitchell, later became the drummer of The Jimi Hendrix Experience.

The film was quite successful, so much so that two years later, actor Hemmings and director Lance Comfort followed up with a sequel titled Be My Guest.

Plot summary
Dave Martin and his friends Phil, Ron and Ricky are Post Office messenger boys who have formed their own four piece rock 'n' roll beat group, the 'Smart Alecs'. They pool their resources to make a tape recording of their original song "Live It Up". Dave is given a month by his unsympathetic father Herbert to get it published or give up his musical dreams. Sent with a special delivery to film producer Mark Watson, Dave gets into the studio where a musical is being made. He is stunned by a falling piece of equipment and is afterwards photographed with the star as compensation. Next day, when the accident and photo are publicised in a newspaper his friends upbraid him for not having mentioning their tape to the producer. He promises to approach Watson again but then discovers that it has vanished. Watson finds it at the studio and, with the group unknown, tries to interest Radio and T.V. in a mystery search. Finally with the help of Dave's girlfriend Jill and his father, Watson and columnist Nancy Spain are brought by taxi to meet the group and the 'Smart Alecs' then make good.

Cast
David Hemmings as Dave Martin
Jennifer Moss as Jill
John Pike as Phil
Heinz Burt as Ron
Steve Marriott as Ricky (credited Stephen Marriott)
Joan Newell as Margaret Martin
Ed Devereaux as Herbert Martin
Veronica Hurst as Kay
Penny Lambirth as Barbara
Peter Glaze as Mike Moss
David Bauer as Mark Watson
Anthony Ashdown as Bob
Douglas Ives as Bingo
Paul Hansard as Film Director
Geoff L'Cise as Assistant
Nancy Spain as Columnist
Peter Haigh as Announcer
Peter Noble as Interviewer
Trevor Maskell as Aldo
Mitch Mitchell as Andrews (credited John Mitchell)
Anthony Sheppard as Commissionaire
Dave Clark as Recording Man (credited David Clark)
Pat Gilbert as Housekeeper

Musical interludes
Kenny Ball and his Jazzmen, playing "Rondo" and "Hand Me Down My Walking Shoes"
Heinz, singing "Live It Up" and "Don't You Understand"
Trisha Noble (credited Patsy Ann Noble), singing "Accidents Will Happen"
Gene Vincent, singing "Tempation Baby"
Jennifer Moss, singing "Please Let It Happen To Me"
Sounds Incorporated (featuring Tony Newman), playing "Keep Moving"
The Outlaws (featuring Ritchie Blackmore, Chas Hodges, Ken Lundgren and Mick Underwood), playing "Law And Disorder"
Kim Roberts, singing "Loving Me This Way"
Andy Cavell and the Saints, singing "Don't Take You From Me"

Exceptionally, the song "Live It Up" is featured at the end of the film but is not credited because the "group" shown playing it (Hemmings and Heinz on guitars, Pike on bass and Marriott on drums) were not the actual music recording artists.

All music and lyrics were written by Joe Meek, with the exception of "Accidents Will Happen" by Norrie Paramor and Bob Barrett.

References

External links
Radio London
David Hemmings
 
 

1963 films
British drama films
1960s musical drama films
Films directed by Lance Comfort
Films shot at Pinewood Studios
1963 drama films
1960s English-language films
1960s British films